Vijama Yadav is an Indian politician. She is widow of deceased Leader Jawahar Yadav (Pandit). She was elected to Pratappur in the 2022 Uttar Pradesh Legislative Assembly election as a member of the Samajwadi Party.

Entrance in politics
Her husband Jawahar Yadav aka Pandit, a member of the Samajwadi Party from the then Jhunsi assembly seat of Allahabad, was elected as a member of the Legislative Assembly for the second consecutive term. Establishing himself as a strong leader, Jawahar Yadav alias Pandit became one of Mulayam Singh Yadav's special people, gradually he ventured into the business of liquor and excavation of morang sand from the Yamuna Ganga basin in which he had a gang war with the Karwariya Family . in June 1995 Mulayam Singh Yadav-led Uttar Pradesh the government fell. Karwariya family was suffering huge losses in the business of Balu Morang from Jawahar Yadav alias Pandit as they had fierce competition with Jawahar Yadav Pandit on their business. After the dissolution of the assembly in 1996, the security he had as an MLA was withdrawn. He requested the government several times for protection but was ignored by the government, on Tuesday, 13 August 1996, when he was going to visit Hanuman ji at Triveni Sangam, He was attacked and murdered with an AK-47 rifle.Karwariya family was suffering huge losses in the business of Balu Morang from Jawahar Yadav alias Pandit as they had fierce competition with Jawahar Yadav Pandit on their business.The Karwariya family was accused of murder. After the murder of her husband, Vijama Yadav came into politics and was elected as MLA on Samajwadi Party ticket for two consecutive terms in 1996, 2002 assembly elections. She was defeated in the 2007 and 2017 assembly elections. In 2012 and 2022 Vidhansabha elections she was elected MLA from Pratappur Vidhansabha Constituency.

Family
Vijama Yadav has a daughter and a son, daughter's name is Jyoti Yadav who has been Block Pramukh of Phulpur block of Prayagraj and son Devendra Pratap Singh Yadav alias Golu has been an honorary councilor of Prayagraj Municipal Corporation.

References

Living people
Uttar Pradesh MLAs 2022–2027
Women members of the Uttar Pradesh Legislative Assembly
Samajwadi Party politicians
21st-century Indian women politicians
1971 births